The Ventasso Horse is a rare breed of horse originating from the upper Val d'Enza valley in the Emilia Romagna region of Italy.  It is one of the fifteen indigenous horse "breeds of limited distribution" recognised by the AIA, the Italian breeders' association. It takes its name from the Monte Ventasso, in the province of Reggio Emilia.

The Ventasso Horse breed was formed through the interbreeding of local horses with the Lipizzaner and the Maremmano. Until the 1940s the horses were supplied to the military. Today it is used as a general riding horse and as a competition sport horse. It is critically endangered, with less than 50 purebred horses remaining.

They are well proportioned and expressive, with a straight profile and a muscular, medium-length neck. The shoulder is sloping. The chest is deep and the back is of good length. bay and gray are the most common colours.

References

Horse breeds
Horse breeds originating in Italy